Flour is a common food ingredient made from wheat, rice, or other starchy sources.

Flour may also refer to:
Flour (band), a musical project of Minneapolis musician Pete Conway
Flour (album), an album by Australian band Screamfeeder
Rock flour, fine particles of rock formed by glacial erosion or mechanical grinding
Wood flour, wood pulverized until it is of the consistency of flour
Flour Lake, a lake in Minnesota
Flour Bakery, owned by Joanne Chang

See also

Flower
Floor
Fleur (disambiguation)
Fluor (disambiguation)